David Starzyk (born July 14, 1961) is an American actor.

Career
Starzyk has guest-starred in a number of notable television series, including Home Improvement, Felicity, Sabrina the Teenage Witch Pacific Blue, NYPD Blue, Days of Our Lives, The Young and the Restless, Charmed, Two and a Half Men, Criminal Minds, What I Like About You, Bones, The Practice, Boston Legal, Lost, Desperate Housewives, Veronica Mars, Victorious, 90210 Person of Interest and among other series.  In 2010, he had a recurring role as Officer Pete, boyfriend to Valerie Bertinelli's character, Melanie Moretti on TV Land's original sitcom Hot in Cleveland.

Starzyk has also appeared in a series of successful and memorable Chase Sapphire television commercials as well as in the feature films To Save a Life and Bring It On: Fight to the Finish, both of which were released in 2009. He also starred in the movie Haunted Echoes launched in 2008, alongside Sean Young, M. Emmet Walsh and Juliet Landau.

Personal life 
He is married to actress Kimberley Ann Fitzgerald and he has two sons, Liam and Finn.

Filmography

Film

Television

References

External links

1961 births
20th-century American male actors
21st-century American male actors
Male actors from Massachusetts
American male film actors
American male soap opera actors
American male television actors
Living people
Actors from Springfield, Massachusetts